Drexel is a town in Burke County, North Carolina, United States. The population was 1,858 at the 2010 census. It is part of the Hickory–Lenoir–Morganton Metropolitan Statistical Area.

Geography
Drexel is located in eastern Burke County at  (35.757137, -81.606714).

Demographics

2020 census

As of the 2020 United States census, there were 1,760 people, 788 households, and 465 families residing in the town.

2000 census
As of the census of 2000, there were 1,938 people, 759 households, and 503 families residing in the town. The population density was 1,383.9 people per square mile (534.5/km2). There were 811 housing units at an average density of 579.1 per square mile (223.7/km2). The racial makeup of the town was 84.47% White, 3.87% African American, 0.41% Native American, 6.97% Asian, 3.41% from other races, and 0.88% from two or more races. Hispanic or Latino of any race were 3.97% of the population.

There were 759 households, out of which 31.2% had children under the age of 18 living with them, 48.7% were married couples living together, 13.3% had a female householder with no husband present, and 33.6% were non-families. 30.3% of all households were made up of individuals, and 13.8% had someone living alone who was 65 years of age or older. The average household size was 2.40 and the average family size was 3.00.

In the town, the population was spread out, with 25.4% under the age of 18, 7.1% from 18 to 24, 28.0% from 25 to 44, 19.8% from 45 to 64, and 19.7% who were 65 years of age or older. The median age was 38 years. For every 100 females, there were 81.3 males. For every 100 females age 18 and over, there were 75.4 males.

The median income for a household in the town was $35,086, and the median income for a family was $41,917. Males had a median income of $28,500 versus $22,827 for females. The per capita income for the town was $18,463. About 4.9% of families and 7.1% of the population were below the poverty line, including 4.9% of those under age 18 and 15.0% of those age 65 or over.

References

External links

 Town website

Towns in Burke County, North Carolina